Rajiv Mehrishi was born on 8 August 1955 in Rajasthan. He was the 13th Comptroller and Auditor General of India (C&AG) and Vice Chairman of the United Nations Panel of External Auditors. He is a retired Indian Administrative Service (IAS) officer of the 1978 batch belonging to the Rajasthan cadre.

He was appointed the Home Secretary of the Government of India on 31 August 2015. Prior to his appointment as the Home Secretary, he was the Finance Secretary. Prior to his stint as the Finance Secretary, he was the Chief Secretary, Government of Rajasthan. He was awarded the Padma Bhushan, India's third highest civilian award,  in 2022 by the Indian Government in the Civil Service. More recently he wrote a book, India 2022.

Personal life 
He is married to Mira (née Sahni) also an officer of the IAS, now retired. His brother-in-law is the lieutenant general Anoop Malhotra. He has three sons, Tarun (married to Aastha Jain), Tushar (married to Pragya Misra) and Abhinav (Vishakha Mehta). One son lives in Bangalore, one in Mumbai and other in the United States. He has the unique hobby of making pickles with his very own recipes and it is available under the brand name 'Pickley— Taste of Dada'.

Education 
Rajiv Mehrishi holds a degree in business administration from Strathclyde Business School, Glasgow. His earlier degrees of BA (History) and MA (History) were from the St. Stephen's College.

Career

As an IAS officer 
Apart from being the Home Secretary of India, Rajiv Mehrishi has served in various key posts in both Union and Rajasthan governments, such as  Chief Secretary of Rajasthan, Principal Resident Commissioner of Rajasthan, Principal Secretary (Finance), Chairman of Indira Gandhi Nahar Board and District Magistrate and Collector of Bikaner in Rajasthan Government, and as the Union Finance Secretary, Union Fertilizers Secretary, and Union Overseas Indian Affairs Secretary, Special Secretary in Ministry of Agriculture and Joint Secretary in the Cabinet Secretariat, in the Union Government.

Rajiv Mehrishi retired on 30 August 2017.

Chief Secretary of Rajasthan 
Mehrishi was appointed the Chief Secretary of Rajasthan by the Chief Minister of Rajasthan on 21 December 2013.

Finance Secretary 
Mehrishi was appointed as the Economic Affairs Secretary by the Appointments Committee of the Cabinet (ACC). As he was the senior-most Secretary in the Ministry of Finance, he was designated as Finance Secretary.

Home Secretary 

Rajiv Mehrishi was appointed as the Union Home Secretary by the Appointments Committee of the Cabinet (ACC) on 31 August 2015.

As Comptroller and Auditor General of India 

Rajiv Mehrishi assumed the office of Comptroller and Auditor General of India (C&AG) on 25 September 2017. Mehrishi also concurrently became the Vice - Chairman of United Nations  Panel of External Auditors.

References

External links

 Executive Record Sheet as maintained by Department of Personnel and Training of Government of India

Indian Administrative Service officers
Comptrollers in India
1955 births
Living people
Indian Home Secretaries
St. Stephen's College, Delhi alumni
People from Jaipur
Recipients of the Padma Bhushan in civil service